Count Christoph of Hohenzollern-Haigerloch (20 March 1552 in Haigerloch – 21 April 1592, Haigerloch) was the first Count of Hohenzollern-Haigerloch.

Life 
Christoph was the third surviving son of Count Karl I of Hohenzollern (1516-1576) from his marriage to Anna (1512-1579), daughter of Ernst, Margrave of Baden-Durlach.  Christoph studied law together with his brother Karl II (1547-1606) studied in Freiburg im Breisgau and Bourges.

When Karl I died in 1576, the County of Hohenzollern was divided into Hohenzollern-Hechingen, Hohenzollern-Sigmaringen and Hohenzollern-Haigerloch.  Christoph, the youngest son, received the Lordship of Haigerloch, which had been acquired in 1497.  It included Enisheim Castle and the towns of Imnau and Stetten.  His eldest brother Eitel Friedrich IV received Hechingen, his other brother Karl II received Sigmaringen.  Christoph's part had 10000 inhabitants at the time and was substantially smaller than the parts of his brothers.  Christoph founded the elder Haigerloch line, which died out with his younger son.

Christoph cared intensely about the administration of his country.  He soon began an extensive reconstruction of his Haigerloch Castle; he felt that the medieval castle was not representative for a ruler of his era.  However, he died before the work could be completed.  Christoph and his wife together founded the Holy Trinity Church in Haigerloch.

When Count Christoph Stanislaus of Nellenburg died in 1591, Christoph inherited the Lordship of Wehrstein with the castle of the same name and the village of Dettensee.  Christoph inherited because Christoph Stanislaus's brother had been married to a countess of Hohenzollern.  The other claimant was Anna Maria of Wolfentein, who had had a failed marriage with a citizen of Bregenz named Fezenn.  Christoph and his brothers discredited her by claiming she had been a prostitute.

Marriage and issue 
Christoph married Catherine (died after 1608), a daughter of Baron Christoph of Welsperg, in Sigmaringen in 1577.  Christoph and Catherine had the following children:
 Johann Christoph (1586-1620), Count of Hohenzollern-Haigerloch
 married in 1608 to Countess Marie Elisabeth of Hohenzollern-Sigmaringen (1592-1659)
 Karl (1588-1634), Count of Hohenzollern-Haigerloch
 married in 1618 to Countess Rosamunde of Ortenburg (d. 1636)
 Gwendolyn Marie Salome (1578-1647), a nun in the Inzigkofen Abbey
 Anna Dorothea († 1647), Prioress at Inzigkofen Abbey
 Marie Sidonia, a nun at Söflingen Abbey
 Jakobe (died after 1607)

References 
 Württembergische Jahrbücher für vaterländische Geschichte, Geographie, Statistik und Topographie, Aue, 1837, p. 115 (Online)
 Gustav Schilling: Geschichte des Hauses Hohenzollern, in genealogisch fortlaufenden Biographien aller seiner Regenten von den ältesten bis auf die neuesten Zeiten, nach Urkunden und andern authentischen Quellen, F. Fleischer, 1843, p. 309 ff
 Fidelis Baur: Geschichte der hohenzollernschen Staaten Hechingen und Sigmaringen, Bucher und Liener, 1834, p. 7 ff

External links 
 Family tree at the site of the Group Prince of Hohenzollern

Counts of Hohenzollern-Haigerloch
1552 births
1592 deaths
16th-century German people
House of Hohenzollern-Haigerloch